Lukas Lämmel (born 8 September 1997) is a German professional footballer who plays as a central midfielder for Regionalliga Nordost club Carl Zeiss Jena.

Career

Starting in 2007 Lämmel passed through all youth teams of 1. FC Union Berlin. Lämmel made his professional debut on the last matchday of the 2016–17 2. Bundesliga season, coming on as a substitute in 1. FC Union Berlin's 2–1 win away to Greuther Fürth.

In July 2017, he was given a professional contract. On 18 August, Union Berlin announced that the club had agreed to terminate Lämmel's contract which was due to expire in 2018, citing small chances of regular playing time.

On 28 October 2017, free agent Lämmel signed with 3. Liga side VfR Aalen following a trial at the club. He played there until 2019, and had a stint with SSV Ulm before joining Regionalliga Nordost club Berliner AK in 2020. He moved to fellow Regionalliga Nordost club Carl Zeiss Jena on 16 June 2022, signing a two-year contract.

References

External links

1997 births
Living people
German footballers
Association football midfielders
1. FC Union Berlin players
VfR Aalen players
SSV Ulm 1846 players
Berliner AK 07 players
FC Carl Zeiss Jena players
2. Bundesliga players
3. Liga players
Regionalliga players
Footballers from Berlin